René Leray (24 March 1901 – 11 January 1988) was a French middle-distance runner. He competed in the men's 1500 metres at the 1920 Summer Olympics.

References

1901 births
1988 deaths
Athletes (track and field) at the 1920 Summer Olympics
French male middle-distance runners
Olympic athletes of France
Place of birth missing